Ādolfs Skulte (Kiev, October 28, 1909 – Riga, March 20, 2000) was a Latvian composer and pedagogue.  Among his pupils were the composers Aivars Kalējs, Romualds Kalsons, Imants Zemzaris,  Romualds Grīnblats, Mārtiņš Brauns and Imants Kalniņš.  As a composer, he wrote orchestral and vocal music, as well as three operas (one for children) and two ballets.  His brother was the composer Bruno Skulte.

External links
 

1909 births
2000 deaths
Musicians from Kyiv
People from Kievsky Uyezd
Members of the Supreme Soviet of the Latvian Soviet Socialist Republic, 1959–1963
Latvian composers
20th-century composers
Riga State Gymnasium No.1 alumni
People's Artists of the USSR
People's Artists of the Latvian Soviet Socialist Republic
Stalin Prize winners
Recipients of the Order of the Red Banner of Labour
Recipients of the Order of the Three Stars